Karm Kshetra Post Graduate College, Etawah, also known as, K.K. P.G. College, Etawah is a college in Etawah, Uttar Pradesh, India.

Affiliations
At first the college was affiliated to Agra University. In the year 1968, it got affiliated to Kanpur University (now Chhatrapati Shahu Ji Maharaj University).

Notable alumni

Arvind Pratap, former MLC
Ashok Kumar Doharey, former MP
Vinay Shakya, former MLA
Mulayam Singh Yadav, former Minister of Defence (India) & Former Chief Minister of Uttar Pradesh
Shivpal Singh Yadav, MLA & former Cabinet Minister (Uttar Pradesh Government)

References

External links
 Official website

Universities and colleges in Etawah district
Educational institutions established in 1959
1959 establishments in Uttar Pradesh
Education in Etawah
Kanpur division
Postgraduate colleges in Uttar Pradesh